Săuca is a commune of 1,470 inhabitants situated in Satu Mare County, Crișana, Romania. It is composed of five villages:

Demographics
Ethnic groups (2002 census): 
Romanians: 50.74%
Hungarians: 35.01%
Romanies (Gypsies): 14.16%

According to mother tongue, 51.63% of the population speak Romanian, while 36.64% speak Hungarian as their first language.

Ferenc Kölcsey, the author of the Hungarian national anthem, was born here in 1790.

References

Communes in Satu Mare County
Localities in Crișana